The Municipality of Slovenske Konjice ( or) is a municipality in the traditional region of Styria in northeastern Slovenia. The seat of the municipality is the town of Slovenske Konjice. Slovenske Konjice became a municipality in 1994.

Geography
The municipality is now included in the Savinja Statistical Region. It is the administrative and cultural center of the Dravinja Valley. About  from Ljubljana, Graz, or Zagreb, it is easily reachable by the A1 motorway and via the small airport Slovenske Konjice near Loče.

Location

Municipality of Slovenske Konjice borders on the municipalities of Šmarje pri Jelšah and Šentjur to the south, Vojnik to the west, Zreče to the northwest, Oplotnica to the north, Slovenska Bistrica to the east, and Rogaška Slatina to the southeast.

Settlements
In addition to the municipal seat of Slovenske Konjice, the municipality also includes the following settlements:

 Bezina
 Blato
 Brdo
 Breg pri Konjicah
 Brezje pri Ločah
 Dobrava pri Konjicah
 Dobrnež
 Draža Vas
 Gabrovlje
 Gabrovnik
 Kamna Gora
 Klokočovnik
 Koble
 Kolačno
 Konjiška Vas
 Kraberk
 Ličenca
 Lipoglav
 Loče
 Mali Breg
 Mlače
 Nova Vas pri Konjicah
 Novo Tepanje
 Ostrožno pri Ločah
 Penoje
 Perovec
 Petelinjek pri Ločah
 Podob
 Podpeč ob Dravinji
 Polene
 Preloge pri Konjicah
 Prežigal
 Selski Vrh
 Škalce
 Škedenj
 Sojek
 Špitalič pri Slovenskih Konjicah
 Spodnja Pristava
 Spodnje Grušovje
 Spodnje Laže
 Spodnje Preloge
 Spodnji Jernej
 Štajerska Vas
 Stare Slemene
 Strtenik
 Suhadol
 Sveti Jernej
 Tepanje
 Tepanjski Vrh
 Tolsti Vrh
 Vešenik
 Zbelovo
 Zbelovska Gora
 Zeče
 Zgornja Pristava
 Zgornje Laže
 Žiče

References

External links

Municipality of Slovenske Konjice on Geopedia
Municipality of Slovenske Konjice website

 
Slovenske Konjice
1994 establishments in Slovenia